Ignacio Camacho Barnola (born 4 May 1990) is a Spanish former professional footballer who played as a defensive midfielder.

An academy graduate at Atlético Madrid, he made his senior debut at the age of 17. He spent the next three years at the club, making 50 appearances and winning Europa League and UEFA Super Cup titles. In 2011 he signed for Málaga, where he spent six and a half years and played competitive 199 matches before joining Wolfsburg.

A full Spain international since 2014, Camacho previously earned 51 caps across the various youth levels for his nation, and was part of the sides which won the 2007 European Under-17 and 2013 European Under-21 Championships.

Club career

Atlético Madrid
Camacho was born in Zaragoza, Aragon. Initially starting out at hometown club Real Zaragoza, he was spotted by Atlético Madrid, and was signed to its youth academy. He made his first-team debut on 1 March 2008, starting, playing 68 minutes and being booked as the Colchoneros won 4–2 at home over FC Barcelona; he had just signed his first professional contract two months earlier.

On 3 May 2008, one day shy of his 18th birthday, Camacho scored his first La Liga goal, netting twice in another home victory, this time 3–0 against Recreativo de Huelva. After some excellent performances in his first season, he would however spend the following campaign restricted to Copa del Rey matches (he did not make the league's squad of 18 in most of the games), with coach Javier Aguirre preferring Portuguese Maniche and new signing Éver Banega; this situation would slightly improve in late February 2009 as new coach Abel Resino had a run-in with Maniche, leaving him out of the squad for the remainder of the season.

Málaga
2009–10 did not provide Camacho with the needed opportunities to progress; injured for most of the early part of the season, when healthy, he was mainly utilised in injury time of games. The following campaign, he appeared even more rarely – no minutes in the league whatsoever – and, in late December 2010, was transferred to Málaga CF, with teammate Sergio Asenjo also making the move in a loan deal.

Camacho scored his first official goal for Málaga on 29 April 2012, from a Jesús Gámez cross for the game's only at home against Valencia CF. He contributed 13 games and 811 minutes as the Andalusia team finished fourth and qualified to the UEFA Champions League for the first time ever.

In 2012–13, Camacho started regularly for the Manuel Pellegrini-led side. In January 2013, he was a central figure in two of the three fixtures between Málaga and Barcelona: on the 13th, his backpass turned into an assist for Lionel Messi for the first in an eventual 1–3 home loss; three days later, he scored in the last minute to earn his team, by then reduced to ten men, a 2–2 draw at the Camp Nou in the quarter-finals of the domestic cup (6–4 aggregate defeat).

During his spell at the La Rosaleda Stadium, Camacho played nearly 200 games all competitions comprised.

VfL Wolfsburg
On 8 July 2017, Camacho signed for VfL Wolfsburg for a reported fee of around €10 million. The following month, he was named as the club's captain behind Mario Gómez and Paul Verhaegh. He made his Bundesliga debut on 19 August, playing the entire 0–3 home loss against Borussia Dortmund. A long-term ankle injury ruled him out for a large part of the campaign, but he returned in March 2018 as the permanent captain of the side following Gómez's departure to VfB Stuttgart two months prior.

Camacho announced his retirement in September 2020 at age 30, due to injuries.

International career
Camacho captained the Spain under-17 team to the title at the 2007 UEFA European Championship, scoring one goal during the tournament. In 2008, following his performances with Atlético's main squad, he was promoted to the under-21s, but missed the 2009 European Championships through injury.

On 7 November 2014, Camacho was called up to full side manager Vicente del Bosque's squad for matches against Belarus and Germany, He made his debut on the 18th against the latter, coming on as a half-time substitute for Sergio Busquets in an eventual 0–1 friendly loss in Vigo.

Personal life
Camacho's father Juan José was also a footballer, as older brother Juanjo. The latter was also a midfielder, who played for several Segunda División and Segunda División B clubs.

Career statistics

Club

1 Includes Copa del Rey, DFB Pokal and Bundesliga play-off matches.

Honours
Atlético Madrid
UEFA Europa League: 2009–10
UEFA Super Cup: 2010
Copa del Rey runner-up: 2009–10

Spain
UEFA European Under-21 Championship: 2013
UEFA European Under-17 Championship: 2007
FIFA U-17 World Cup runner-up: 2007

References

External links

1990 births
Living people
Spanish footballers
Footballers from Zaragoza
Association football midfielders
La Liga players
Segunda División B players
Atlético Madrid B players
Atlético Madrid footballers
Málaga CF players
Bundesliga players
VfL Wolfsburg players
UEFA Europa League winning players
Spain youth international footballers
Spain under-21 international footballers
Spain international footballers
Spanish expatriate footballers
Expatriate footballers in Germany
Spanish expatriate sportspeople in Germany